Dionconotus is a genus of plant bugs belonging to the family Miridae, subfamily Mirinae. Species of this genus are present in Albania, Austria, Bulgaria, Croatia, France, Greece, Hungary, Italy, North Macedonia, Romania, Slovenia and the former Yugoslavia.

Species
 Dionconotus confluens Hoberlandt, 1945
 Dionconotus cruentatus (Brullé, 1832)
 Dionconotus neglectus (Fabricius, 1798)
 Dionconotus parnisanus Hoberlandt, 1945

References

External links
 BioLib
 Fauna Europaea

Miridae genera
Mirini